Malcolm Hamilton may refer to:

 Malcolm Hamilton (bishop) (died 1629), Church of Ireland Archbishop of Cashel
 Lord Malcolm Douglas-Hamilton (1909-1964), Scottish politician and nobleman
 Malcolm Hamilton (harpsichordist) (1932–2003), American harpsichordist
 Malcolm Xavier Hamilton (born 1972), American football player
 Malcolm Hamilton (River City), a fictional character in the BBC Scotland TV soap opera River City
 Malcolm Hamilton (general) (1635-1699), son-in-law of Sir John Maclean, 1st Baronet